Kashchey the Immortal is a 1945 black and white Soviet fantasy film directed by Aleksandr Rou and produced at Soyuzdetfilm Studios. The story and characters are drawn from Slavic folklore, particularly, evil wizard Kashchey, who is the main antagonist in the movie.

Allegory
Filmed during the Second World War and premiered on Victory Day, it may be interpreted as an allegory of the German invasion of the Soviet Union. "Like a bolt from the blue came Kashchey to Rus, destroyed our houses and livelihood, killed men and kidnapped women by the thousands." But in the end, after many hardships, the Russian people manage to drive the invader out of their homeland.

Cast 
 Sergei Stolyarov as Nikita Kozhemyaka
 Alexander Shirshov as Bulat Balagur
 Galina Grigorieva as Maria Morevna
 Georgy Millyar as Kashchey the Immortal / magician
 Ivan Ryzhov  as naughty boy
 Sergei Troitsky as sultan
 Leonid Krovitsky as judge
 Sergey Filippov as executioner
 Peter Galadzhev as guard
 Ivan Bobrov as guard
 Emmanuil Geller as guard

References

External links

 (English subtitles)

1945 films
Russian children's fantasy films
Gorky Film Studio films
Films based on folklore
Films based on Russian folklore
Films based on Slavic mythology
Films shot in Siberia
Films shot in Tajikistan
Soviet children's fantasy films
1940s children's fantasy films
Soviet black-and-white films
Films directed by Aleksandr Rou
Russian black-and-white films
Films based on fairy tales
1940s Russian-language films